The 2011 British Figure Skating Championships was held from November 21 to 27, 2010 at the IceSheffield in Sheffield. Medals were awarded in the disciplines of men's singles, ladies' singles, pair skating, and ice dancing on the senior, junior, and novice levels. The results were among the criteria to determine the British teams for the 2011 World Championships, 2011 World Junior Championships, and 2011 European Championships.

Medalists

Senior

Junior

Novice

Senior results

Men

Ladies

Pairs

Ice dancing

External links
 2011 British Championships results
 National Ice Skating Association

2011
2010 in figure skating
2011 in figure skating
Figure Skating Championships,2011
Figure Skating Championships,2011